Richard Hugo Sällström (December 15, 1870 – February 19, 1951) was a Swedish sailor who competed in the 1912 Summer Olympics. He was a crew member of the Swedish boat Erna Signe, which won the silver medal in the 12 metre class.

References

External links 
 
 

1870 births
1951 deaths
Swedish male sailors (sport)
Olympic sailors of Sweden
Olympic silver medalists for Sweden
Olympic medalists in sailing
Medalists at the 1912 Summer Olympics
Sailors at the 1912 Summer Olympics – 12 Metre